Jensen-Group is an international company that manufactures machines for the heavy-duty laundry industry, based in Belgium, but originating in Denmark, on the island Bornholm. Its headquarters are at Bijenstraat 6, Sint-Denijs-Westrem, Ghent (Dutch language Gent), East Flanders, Belgium.

History 

The Jensen-Group traces its origins back to a servicing and manufacturing company that was founded in 1937 in Østermarie on Bornholm, a Danish Island in the Baltic Sea. In 1960, Jørn Munch Jensen (1932-2012) developed the first folding machine for heavy-duty laundries and began marketing the product worldwide. It has one of its production sites in Rønne.

In 1973 the first feeder was added to the product range. JENSEN then developed its own ironer in the 80’s and started supplying complete flatwork finishing systems and later added garment technology through the acquisition of Metricon Conveyor Systems in the 90’s. 

In 1998, Jesper Munch Jensen (b. 1966, CEO) instigated an expansion program that led to the acquisition of Senking GmbH, Futurail and L-Tron and made JENSEN the first total laundry automation supplier.

Present day
Today, the JENSEN-GROUP is organized into four worldwide business regions and two technology centers - washroom and finishing technology - with a total of six production sites.

References 

Ghent
Laundry businesses
Manufacturing companies of Belgium
Multinational companies headquartered in Belgium
Manufacturing companies established in 1937
Danish companies established in 1937
Companies based in East Flanders